The Meteors were a Dutch new wave band active 1977-1982. Band members included singer Hugo Sinzheimer, Åke Danielson (keyboards) Ferdinand Bakker (guitar), Gerrit Veen (bass) and Kim Haworth (drums).

Discography

Albums
 1979 - Teenage Heart, LP, Bovema Negram, 5C 064-26235
 1980 - Hunger, LP,  EMI Group, 1A 062-26540,  1980 - No. 30
 1982 - Stormy Seas, LP,  CNR Records, 655155,  1982
 2004 - Teenage Heart Xtra, EMI reissue of 1979 album with extra tracks
 2005 - Hunger Xtra,  EMI, reissue of 1980 album

Singles
 "It's You, Only You" (Mein Schmerz), 7", 1979, Negram 5C 006-26213, b/w "Night Life"
 "Candy", 7 inch, 1980,  Harvest  1A 006-26594, b/w "It Sucks"
 "Pilot", 7 inch, 1980, Harvest, 1A 006-26447, b/w "Pilot Conversation"
 "Together Too Long", 7 inch, 1980, Harvest, 1A 006-26539, b/w "Out of the Race"
 "No Way In, No Way Out", 7 inch, 1981, Harvest, 006-26645, b/w "Charms or Chains"
 "Stormy Seas", 7 inch, 1982, CNR, 144926, b/w "Shoot or Be Shot"
 "Cha no yu", maxi disco single, 1982, CNR, 151.084 b/w "Expedition 2 (Radio Version)"

References

Musical groups established in 1977
Dutch new wave musical groups
Musical groups disestablished in 1982